Boy Meets Boy is a musical comedy 
with music and lyrics by Bill Solly, and book by Bill Solly and Donald Ward. It opened on Sep. 17, 1975 at the off-Broadway Actor's Playhouse in New York City. It was produced by
Christopher Larkin and Edith O'Hara in association with Lee Barton.

The show is a fast-paced, light-hearted musical-comedy, featuring a 1930s style Astaire/Rogers romance between two men, and a same-sex marriage. The world of the play posits that in 1936, same-sex relationships are considered as normal as heterosexual ones. The play begins against the background of the abdication of Edward VIII and ends with the Duke of Windsor's (and the protagonists') June 1937 weddings. This is appropriate, as one of the major themes is "Giving it Up for Love". The action occurs in the Savoy Hotel, a few elegant nightspots in London, a bar in Spain, and a black-sheep aunt's disreputable establishment in Paris.

The original New York cast included David Gallegly as Guy Rose, Joe Barrett as Casey O’Brien and Raymond Wood as Clarence Cutler. The show had its London premiere in December 2012. The cast included Olivier Award winner Stephen Ashfield as Casey O'Brien with Johnjo Flynn as Guy Rose and Ben Kavanagh as Clarence Cutler.

Critical reception 

The original production at the Actor's Playhouse in New York received admiring reviews - save for a criticism in the New York Times by Mel Gussow (about the acceptance of gay marriage in the 30s, he wrote, "So much for thirties realism."). “The brightest, tunefullest, wittiest, most elegant, refined, gracious and entertaining musical in years!" wrote Carll Tucker in The Village Voice. In New York magazine, Alan Rich wrote that the play had “an uncommonly light and antic touch. The first of its kind that could happily play in an old ladies’ home in Dubuque...delightful”; while Robert Patrick said that "it rewrites the past and presents it just as entertainment, not in the Orwellian sense of trying to convince anyone the past was like that but saying that it ought to have been”.  The production ran for two years. Subsequent productions in Los Angeles and San Francisco received positive reactions. It has often been revived regionally.

The 2012 production at the Jermyn Street Theatre in London was well received by the British press. Libby Purves in the Times called it “Funny, silly and, with gay marriage on the horizon, slyly topical." Emma Slater wrote that it was "an unexpected gem of a musical. The score is varied in style and form, the lyrics clever, and the script highly intelligent and very funny. Both the script and lyrics have elements of Wilde’s wit and Coward’s charm. A festive treat – highly recommended!”. Meanwhile, in the New Statesman, Ryan Gibely thought that while "in 1975 this lithe blasé vision of an alternative reality must have felt subversive [the] surprise is that it still does."

Musical numbers

 Prologue
 "Boy Meets Boy" - Chorus
 “Party in Room 203” - Chorus

 Act I
 "Giving it Up for Love" - Casey, Andrew
 "Me" - Clarence
 "The English Rose" - Reporters
 "Marry an American" - Waitresses
 "Marry an American" - Waiters
 “It’s a Boy’s Life” - Casey, Guy
 "Does Anybody Love You?" - Guy
 "You’re Beautiful" - Guy
 "Let's!" - Guy, Casey

 Act II
 “Paris” - Josephine, Guy (song added for London production)
 "Just My Luck" - Clarence, Casey
 "It's a Dolly" - Josephine, Chorus
 "What Do I Care" - Guy
 “In Love Never” - Casey (song added for London production)
 “Clarence’s Turn - Clarence
 “It’s a Dolly: Reprise” - Josephine, Chorus
 "Does Anybody Love You: Reprise" - Guy, Casey
 "Finale" - Cast

References

External links

Queer Music Heritage article on the play
Guide to Musical Theatre page
Cast Album on AllMusic.com

1975 musicals
Off-Broadway musicals
Original musicals
LGBT-related musicals